Blackwattle Bay is a bay located to the southeast of Glebe Island and east of Rozelle Bay on Sydney Harbour, in New South Wales, Australia. The bay was named in 1788 after the Black Wattle tree found at the bay, which was used for housing construction.

When first used, the bay was a swampy inlet fed by a creek that ran from its eastern end. Industrial use by tanners and slaughter houses caused the area to be fouled by noxious fumes and there were many complaints by the residents. 

An embankment with a bridge was built across the swamp to provide access from Glebe to Pyrmont, being known as Bridge Rd. The area to the east of the road was filled in becoming Wentworth Park. A coal unloader and other facilities were built on the west side of the road and it now also features the Sydney Fish Market on its northern side.

See also 

Blackwattle Bay coal wharves and depots
Sydney Fish Market
Wentworth Park

References

Gallery

External links
 
 
 Blackwattle Bay entry at dictionary of Sydney
 Part of Chippendale's grant, 1838. Cadastral drawing showing Cooper's Dam and Black Wattle Swamp.
 Birds eye view of general wharfage scheme west of Dawes Point as it will appear when completed, Sydney Harbour Trust, 1913.

Bays of New South Wales
Tourist attractions in Sydney
Sydney Harbour
Glebe, New South Wales